Li Chao is the name of:

Li Chao (golfer) (born 1980), Chinese professional golfer
Li Chao (footballer) (born 1987), Chinese football player
Li Chao (chess player) (born 1989), Chinese chess grandmaster
Li Chao (actor) (born 1982), Chinese actor